Muara Town or simply Muara is a port town in Brunei-Muara District, Brunei, about  from the capital Bandar Seri Begawan. The population of the town proper was 2,102 in 2016. It is home to Muara Port, the country's primary deep water port.

Location
Muara can be found in Mukim Serasa and is located on the easternmost tip of West Brunei. It lends its name to the district which it is in, the Brunei-Muara district. To the north is the South China Sea, to the south is the Brunei Bay, and across the bay is Pulau Muara Besar. To the east, across a man-made channel, are the remains of Tanjung Pelumpong (Cape Pelumpong, now an island). The rest of the Brunei-Muara district is situated on the west side. Serasa lies to the south-west of Muara.

History

Before the 1900s, the village of Muara was inhabited by a small group of Malay fishermen.

Rapid development was seen in the area of Serai Pimping in 1883 to extract coal, which was used to fuel passing steamships; later, under the government of Sarawak, the area around the settlement was developed and was named Brooketon, after Charles Brooke, the White Rajah of Sarawak, in 1889.

The development of the Brooketon Colliery coal mine also led to transport and infrastructure development in Muara. A wooden railway was built to transport the coal to the deep-water anchorage at Muara, and wharves and jetties were built to allow steamships and barges to berth. By 1911, more than 1,447 people lived in Muara and some 30 shops had opened in the town. Brooketon was also where the first postage stamp in Brunei was issued.

Although he only had economic privileges, Brooke became the de facto political ruler of the area. The coal mines employed hundreds of miners, which compelled Brooke to introduce a police force, a post office, and roads, effectively transforming Muara into an extraterritorial extension of Sarawak. It was not until 1921 that Muara was "returned" to Brunei. The mine closed in 1924 because of heavy financial losses caused by the continuously decreasing price of coal during the world economic recession.

The Japanese occupied Brunei during Second World War and attempted unsuccessfully to reopen the coal mine. Brooketon was the landing location of the Australian forces as part of the Borneo Campaign, at the end of the Second World War, which liberated Brunei from Japanese occupation.

Under the rule of Sultan Omar Ali Saifuddin, the area was developed into a deepwater port to assist in the development of the country. Since 1973, Muara Port has undergone extensive improvements. These include extensions to the wharf, bringing its total length to 948 meters (including 250 meters dedicated container wharf and 87 metres aggregate wharf). The overall covered storage capacity is 16,950 square meters. The site also features long storage warehouses with a combined capacity of 16,630 square meters and open storage space of 5 hectares. Facilities for the dedicated container wharf cover an area of 92,034 square meters, including 8,034 square metres of covered areas.

Administration 
Pekan Muara is an unincorporated town; it does not have a municipal body. Instead, the town is officially a village subdivision, whereby it is one of the villages within Mukim Serasa.

The town has the postcode is BT1128.

Muara was formerly part of the separate Muara district until in 1938 when it became part of the present-day Brunei-Muara district.

Economy
Part of the deepwater port of Muara is occupied by two Royal Dutch Shell petroleum facilities.

Brunei Shell Marketing maintains a large presence in Muara through its Muara Terminal. There are numerous bottled gas containers on the site and a number of tanks holding various products, including bitumen.

Transportation

Road

Jalan Muara is Muara's main road. It originates in Mukim Berakas near the Brunei International Airport and terminates at the artificial channel at Tanjong Pelumpong. It connects Muara town to Bandar Seri Begawan. Jalan Serasa and Jalan Persuahan branch off from Jalan Muara and connect Muara with Serasa. Tjey enables products manufactured in the Serasa Industrial Area to be transported to Muara Port for export.

The Muara-Tutong Highway starts at a roundabout on Jalan Muara between Kampong Sungai Kebun and Kampong Meragang. It connects Muara to Jerudong and Tutong. Muara is served by the purple buses of the Eastern Line. Route numbers 33, 37, 38 and 39 connect Muara with Serasa and the rest of the country.

Rail
There are currently no railways or light rail facilities in Muara, as the line connecting Brooketon Colliery to what is now Muara Port is defunct.

Ports

Muara Port was opened for commercial operations in February 1973 and was commissioned by the Ports Department on 1 May 1974. The Ports Department took over the management and operations of all ports on 1 January 1986, forming the Royal Customs and Excise Department.

The Muara Container Terminal was operated by the PSA International until 1 April 2007, when it was turned to the Brunei Government. It features one container berth with a quay length of 250m and a max draft of 12.5m. There is an existing plan by the Brunei Economic Development Board to further develop the port by further dredging the Muara Cut, constructing additional port facilities on Pulau Muara Besar, and linking the latter to the mainland with a bridge.

From May 2009, International Container Terminal Service Inc (ICTSI), based in Manila, Philippines, set up a subsidiary, New Muara Container Terminal Service Sdm Bhd (NMCTS), to operate the Muara Container Terminal. August 2009, Chinese destroyer Guangzhou made a goodwill visit to Muara Port from Manado. In early 2017, Muara Port Company Sdn Bhd, a joint-venture company of Darussalam Assets Sdn Bhd and Beibu Gulf Holding(Hong Kong) Co.,Ltd., took over the operation of the terminal.

The port is part of the Maritime Silk Road that runs from the Chinese coast to Singapore and the southern tip of India, west from India to Mombasa, Kenya, through the Red Sea via the Suez Canal to the Mediterranean, and then via Athens to the Upper Adriatic hub of Trieste, Italy, with its rail connections to Central Europe and the North Sea.

Air
There are no airports in Muara. Commercial travellers would have to travel to either Bandar Seri Begawan or Labuan (from Serasa) to catch a commercial flight.

Infrastructure 
Brunei Shell Petroleum has a jetty along Muara Port to support their offshore operations in Brunei. The jetty measures 120 metres by 48 metres and equipped with three loading facilities and 14 storage tanks.

Military 

The Royal Brunei Navy of the Royal Brunei Armed Forces is based in the Muara Naval Base, which is located in the Tanjong Pelumpong area of Muara. The Naval Base was expanded in 1997 to include facilities to support three offshore support vessels.

Recreation 
The main tourist attraction of Muara is Muara beach, which stretches along the coast of the South China Sea. The beach is about a mile long and consists of clear white sand. Amenities here include a picnic area, a children's playground, changing and toilet facilities, as well as weekend food and drink stalls.

Notable people 

 Lim Jock Seng (born 1944), Chinese politician and minister

References

External links 
 

Populated places in Brunei
Villages in Brunei-Muara District